Yseult Island is a small rocky island  east of Tristan Island and  north of the east point on Cape Jules. Photographed from the air by U.S. Navy Operation Highjump, 1946–47. Charted by the French Antarctic Expedition under Barre, 1951–52, and so named because of its twin relationship with Tristan Island. Yseult is the French spelling of Isolde, legendary heroine incorporated into Arthurian legend and later popularized by Richard Wagner's opera Tristan und Isolde.

See also 
 List of Antarctic and sub-Antarctic islands

Islands of Adélie Land